The 2023 Supersport World Championship is the twenty-seventh season of the Supersport World Championship, the twenty-fifth held under this name.

Race calendar

The provisional 2023 season calendar was announced on 8 November 2022. It was then updated on 28 February 2023 to announce the seventh round at Imola Circuit on 14–16 July.

Entry list

Rider changes 
 Dynavolt Triumph will have a new line-up, the riders of the team are Harry Truelove and Niki Tuuli.
 Jorge Navarro joined Ten Kate Racing Yamaha.
 Marcel Schrötter joined MV Agusta Reparto Corse, replacing Niki Tuuli.
 Valentin Debise joined GMT94 Yamaha, replacing Jules Cluzel who retired from racing.
 Luke Power joined Motozoo Racing by Puccetti.
 Yuta Okaya joined Prodina Racing WorldSSP.
 Yari Montella joined Barni Spark Racing Team, replacing Oli Bayliss.
 2021 British Superbike Champion Tarran Mackenzie and Adam Norrodin include the line-up of the MIE MS Honda team.
 John McPhee switches from Moto3 to World Supersport Championship.
 Andrea Mantovani joined Evan Bros. WorldSSP Yamaha Team.
 The son of late former 500cc/MotoGP and World Superbike rider Norifumi Abe, Maiki Abe joins VFT Racing.
 Long-time Asia Road Racing Championship stalwart, Yamaha Thailand Racing Team joined Supersport World Championship full-time with Thai duo, Anupab Sarmoon and Apiwat Wongthananon.
 2022 Supersport 300 World Champion Álvaro Díaz step up to Supersport World Championship with Arco YART Yamaha WorldSSP.

Championship standings
Points

Riders' championship

Teams' championship

Manufacturers' championship

Notes

References

External links 

Supersport World Championship seasons
Supersport World Championship
Supersport World Championship